A Voice for Men, also known as AVfM, AVFM or AV4M, is a United States-based for-profit limited liability company and online publication founded in 2009 by Paul Elam. A proponent of the men's rights movement, or "Men's Human Rights Activism", it is the largest and most influential men's rights website. Its editorial position is strongly antifeminist and frequently accuses some feminists of being misandrists on the basis of their actions.

About 
A Voice for Men hosts radio shows, has a forum and posts articles on its website. It occasionally features groups. AVFM's staff members and contributors are unpaid volunteers with the exception of the founder. The site features an online store, called "The Red Pill Shop" (named for the red pill meme), which sells T-shirts, cell phone covers, and holiday decorations. The site also accepts financial donations. Elam says "every dollar goes right in my pocket," but is used to advance the group's cause. According to Dun & Bradstreet's database, as of 2014 AVFM had an estimated $120,000 in yearly revenue and one employee.

In March 2011, AVFM launched a broadcasting franchise on BlogTalkRadio. Paul Elam hosted the first broadcast.

Activities 
In early 2011, AVFM created the website Register-Her, a wiki page which initially listed the names, addresses and other personal information of women convicted of murdering or raping men. The registry expanded over time to include women considered by the sites operators to be guilty of "false rape accusations" or "anti-male bigotry". Under the motto "Why are these women not in jail?", the site also published personally identifying information of women who participated in protests against the men's rights movement (MRM), mocked the MRM on social media, or who voiced feminist supportive ideas. AVFM founder Paul Elam stated that there would no longer be "any place to hide on the internet" for "lying bitches". The site was closed for a period of time, but later it was back up again at a different web address (at least, until February 18, 2020).

In 2014, AVFM launched a website called White Ribbon, adopting graphics and language from the White Ribbon Campaign, a violence prevention program which was established in 1991. AVFM's White Ribbon site was initially established as a response to the White Ribbon Campaign, arguing that women's shelters were "hotbeds of gender hatred" and that "corrupt academics" had conspired to conceal violence against men. The website was harshly criticized by Todd Minerson, Executive Director of White Ribbon, who stated that the AVFM White Ribbon website is a "misguided attempt to discredit others" and urged its supporters "not to be fooled by this copycat campaign".

AVFM individuals assisted in setting up the first International Conference on Men's Issues, which was held in Detroit, Michigan in late June 2014. At the gathering attended by a few hundred men, and a few women, Elam stated that the choice of the city took place since it represents "masculinity". Individuals who gave speeches included Mike Buchanan from the UK's Justice for Men and Boys (J4MB) party and Warren Farrell. Topics discussed included the effect of unemployment on men in the aftermath of the world economic recession, the possibility of developing a male birth control pill, and attempts to increase care for men who had served in the U.S. military.

The 2018 International Conference on Men's Issues (ICMI18), organized in association with the British political party Justice for Men and Boys, was due to have taken place at St Andrew's, the home of Birmingham City Football Club, UK, between July 6 and 8, 2018. However, in early November 2017 the club cancelled the intended use of their facilities saying that they had been "misled at the time of booking". Mike Buchanan, the leader of J4MB, had initially said he still intended for the conference to go ahead at St Andrew's as he felt he had "a perfectly good and legally binding contract". The conference was instead held at the ExCeL, London between July 20 and 22, 2018.

Criticism 

AVFM was included in a list of twelve websites in the spring 2012 issue ("The Year in Hate and Extremism") of the Southern Poverty Law Center's (SPLC) Intelligence Report in a section called "Misogyny: The Sites". The issue outlined the "manosphere", describing it as "hundreds of websites, blogs and forums dedicated to savaging feminists in particular and women...in general". The report credited some sites as making an attempt at civility and trying "to back their arguments with facts" but condemned almost all of them for being "thick with misogynistic attacks that can be astounding for the guttural hatred they express" and ultimately described them as "women-hating".

A prominent example used of AVFM inciting violence against women was the declaration of the month of October as "Bash A Violent Bitch Month", with Paul Elam stating, "A man hitting you back after you have assaulted him does not make you a victim of domestic violence. It makes you a recipient of justice. Deal with it."

Later that year, the SPLC published a statement about the reactions to their report, saying it "provoked a tremendous response among men's rights activists (MRAs) and their sympathizers", and that "[i]t should be mentioned that the SPLC did not label MRAs as members of a hate movement; nor did our article claim that the grievances they air on their websites – false rape accusations, ruinous divorce settlements and the like – are all without merit. But we did call out specific examples of misogyny and the threat, overt or implicit, of violence".

A 2014 statement by the SPLC criticized the International Conference on Men's Issues, particularly finding fault with the citations made that "40% to 50% of rape allegations are false" since the SPLC views that "the best scholarly studies show that between about 2% and 8% of such allegations are actually false— a rate that is comparable for false allegations of most other violent crimes." However, the organization's statement also argued that the AVFM-associated conference was "relatively subdued" given that most of those there worked to keep "vitriol to a minimum" in the discussions. A commentary on the nature of grief for men received praise from the SPLC, but the organization cautioned that the nature of prior material stated by those in AVFM was still a severe problem.

AVFM's rhetoric has been described as misogynistic and hateful by feminist commentators such as Leah McLaren, Jaclyn Friedman, Jill Filipovic, Brad Casey, Clementine Ford, and Mark Potok of the SPLC. Writing in The New York Times, Charles McGrath stated that websites like AVFM contain "a certain amount of anti-feminist hostility, if not outright misogyny". Time has reported on SPLC's "misogynist" description of the group as well as on the movement's official disavowing the concept of misogyny, with Elam cited as stating that being controversial was a way of drawing attention. Journalist Jessica Roy remarked that she found the AVFM conference divided between many individuals making violent threats and laughing openly at jokes about rape, and many individuals seeking to promote socioeconomic and legal changes by polite discussion.

In 2018, the SPLC categorized AVFM as a male supremacist hate group.

References

Further reading

External links 

2009 establishments in the United States
Criticism of feminism
Manosphere
Men's rights organizations
Men's websites
Opposition to feminism